Christobel Katona (born 13 February 1999) is a Zimbabwean footballer who plays as a midfielder for Black Rhinos Queens FC and the Zimbabwe women's national team.

Club career
Katona played for Zimbabwean club Black Rhinos Queens at the 2021 CAF Women's Champions League COSAFA Qualifiers.

International career
Katona capped for Zimbabwe at senior level during the 2021 COSAFA Women's Championship.

References

1999 births
Living people
Zimbabwean women's footballers
Women's association football midfielders
Zimbabwe women's international footballers